Bomarsund may refer to:

Bomarsund, Åland, fortress in the Åland Islands, in the Baltic Sea
Bomarsund, Northumberland, village in Northumberland, England